Mills Creek may refer to:

Mills Creek (Missouri), a stream in Missouri
Mills Creek, a San Francisco Bay Area stream with mouth at Arroyo León
Mills Creek, a California stream with headwaters on the Sierra Crest at the Mills Creek cirque
Mills Creek (San Mateo County), a stream flowing through Burlingame to the San Francisco Bay

References